The year 1915 in architecture involved some significant architectural events and new buildings.

Buildings and structures

Buildings opened

 April – The Hiroshima Prefectural Commercial Exhibition, designed by Jan Letzel, is opened; it becomes the Hiroshima Peace Memorial.
 April 21 – Theatre Circo, Braga, Portugal.
 November 6 – Tunkhannock Viaduct, Nicholson, Pennsylvania, designed by Abraham Burton Cohen.

Buildings completed
 Prince of Wales Museum of Western India, Bombay, designed by George Wittet.
 Kumarakottam Temple, Kanchipuram, India rebuilt.
 Yosemite Lodge at the Falls, Yosemite Village, California.
 Well Hall Estate for arsenal workers at Woolwich in south-east London, designed by Frank Baines.

Awards
 RIBA Royal Gold Medal – Frank Darling.
 Grand Prix de Rome, architecture: not held.

Births
 April 22 – Edward Larrabee Barnes, American architect (died 2004)
 May 8 – Laurent Chappis, French architect and town planner (died 2013)
 October 4 – Beverly Loraine Greene, African American architect (died 1957)
 December 12 – Tobias Faber, Danish architect and academic (died 2010)
 December 31 – George Pace, English ecclesiastical architect (died 1975)

Deaths
 February 17 – George Franklin Barber, American residential architect (born 1854)
 April 17 – Philip Webb, English architect (born 1831)
 May 28 – Robert Chisholm, British "Indo-Saracenic" architect (born 1840)
 June 25 – John James Clark, Australian architect (born 1838)
 July 11 – Albert Schickedanz, Austro-Hungarian architect and painter in the Eclectic style (born 1846)

References